Liu Shaoziyang (born 11 December 2003) is a Chinese professional footballer who plays as a goalkeeper for 2. Liga club Grazer AK, on loan from Bayern Munich II.

Club career

Early career
Born in Wenzhou, Zhejiang, but moving to Wuhan as a child, Liu initially started his career as an outfield player, but switched to play in goal when a coach at his primary school noted his tall height and potential ability as a goalkeeper. Against his mother's wishes, Liu started training as a goalkeeper with his coach before the main school training every day. When his mother did eventually see him play in goal, and produce some good saves, she told the coach that she supported Liu playing as a goalkeeper.

In 2014, Liu joined the youth team of Wuhan Three Towns, before moving to Spain to study and improve his footballing ability.

Move to Europe

Bayern Munich
In January 2021, Liu began training with German giants Bayern Munich. He would regularly return to the Bavarian club for further training throughout the year, and in December it was announced that a professional contract had been signed. In signing for Bayern Munich, Liu became their first ever Chinese player.

Loan to Austria
On 1 February 2022, it was announced that Liu had signed for Austrian Bundesliga club Austria Klagenfurt on loan until the end of the 2022–23 season. Having only featured with the reserves on Austria Klagenfurt II at the Kärntner Liga, and also with the under-19 team, his loan spell was early terminated and he was instead loaned to 2. Liga club Grazer AK until the end of the season.

International career
Liu has represented China at various youth levels internationally.

Personal life
Liu has named Barcelona goalkeeper Marc-André ter Stegen as an inspiration to him. He supports English Premier League club Everton.

Career statistics

Club
.

References

External links
 

2003 births
Living people
Chinese footballers
China youth international footballers
Association football goalkeepers
Wuhan Three Towns F.C. players
FC Bayern Munich footballers
SK Austria Klagenfurt players
Chinese expatriate footballers
Chinese expatriate sportspeople in Spain
Expatriate footballers in Spain
Chinese expatriate sportspeople in Germany
Expatriate footballers in Germany
Expatriate footballers in Austria